The 2010 Nürburgring Superbike World Championship round was the eleventh round of the 2010 Superbike World Championship season. It took place on the weekend of September 3–5, 2010, at the Nürburgring.

Results

Superbike race 1 classification
Race 1 was red flagged after one lap due to a crash involving Leon Haslam and Troy Corser, and later restarted with full length.

Superbike race 2 classification

Supersport race classification

References
 Superbike Race 1
 Superbike Race 2
 Supersport Race

Nurburgring Round
Nurburgring Superbike
Sport in Rhineland-Palatinate